Mario Camus García (20 April 1935 – 18 September 2021) was a Spanish film director and screenwriter. He won the  Golden Bear at the 33rd Berlin International Film Festival with La colmena. His 1987 film The House of Bernarda Alba was screened in the Un Certain Regard section at the 1987 Cannes Film Festival and in the main competition at the 15th Moscow International Film Festival. His 1993 film Shadows in a Conflict was entered into the 18th Moscow International Film Festival.

Filmography

Film director
 1962 – El Borracho
 1963 – La Suerte
 1963 – Los Farsantes
 1964 – Young Sánchez
 1965 – La visita que no tocó el timbre
 1965 – Muere una mujer
 1966 – With the East Wind
 1966 – Cuando tú no estás
 1967 – Soledad
 1967 – Al ponerse el sol
 1968 – Cuentos y leyendas (TVE) (series)
 1968 – Volver a vivir
 1968 – Let Them Talk
 1969 – Esa mujer
 1970 – The Wind's Fierce
 1972 – Si las piedras hablaran (TVE) (series)
 1973 – La leyenda del alcalde de Zalamea
 1975 – Los Pájaros de Baden-Baden
 1975 – La Joven casada
 1976 and 1977 – Paisajes con figuras (TVE) (series)
 1976 – Curro Jiménez (TVE) (series)
 1978 – Los días del pasado
 1980 – Fortunata y Jacinta (TVE) (miniserie)
 1982 – La colmena
 1983 – Los desastres de la guerra
 1984 – The Holy Innocents
 1985 – La vieja música
 1987 – The House of Bernarda Alba
 1987 – La Rusa
 1990 – La forja de un rebelde (TVE) miniserie
 1990 – La femme et le pantin
 1992 – Después del sueño
 1993 – Shadows in a Conflict
 1994 – Amor propio
 1996 – Adosados
 1997 – El color de las nubes
 1998 – La Vuelta de El Coyote
 1999 – La ciudad de los prodigios
 2002 – La playa de los galgos
 2007 – El prado de las estrellas

Screenwriter 
 1962 – The Delinquents
 1962 – El Borracho
 1963 – La Suerte
 1963 – Los farsantes
 1964 – Young Sánchez
 1964 – Weeping for a Bandit
 1965 – La visita que no tocó el timbre
 1965 – El que enseña
 1965 – Muere una mujer
 1966 – With the East Wind
 1966 – Cuando tú no estás
 1967 – Al ponerse el sol
 1968 – Volver a vivir
 1970 – The Wind's Fierce
 1972 – Chicas de club
 1975 – Los Pájaros de Baden-Baden
 1975 – La Joven casada
 1978 – Los días del pasado
 1980 – Fortunata y Jacinta
 1983 – Truhanes
 1984 – The Holy Innocents
 1985 – La vieja música
 1985 – Luces de bohemia
 1985 – Marbella, un golpe de cinco estrellas
 1986 – Werther
 1987 – The House of Bernarda Alba
 1987 – La Rusa
 1988 – Gallego
 1991 – Beltenebros
 1992 – Después del sueño
 1993 – The Bird of Happiness
 1993 – Shadows in a Conflict
 1994 – Amor propio
 1996 – Adosados
 1996 – Más allá del jardín
 1997 – El color de las nubes
 1998 – La Vuelta de El Coyote
 1999 – La ciudad de los prodigios
 2002 – La playa de los galgos
 2004 – Roma
 2007 – El prado de las estrellas

References

External links

1935 births
2021 deaths
People from Santander, Spain
Film directors from Cantabria
Spanish film directors
Spanish male screenwriters
Spanish anti-capitalists
Honorary Goya Award winners
Directors of Golden Bear winners
20th-century Spanish screenwriters
20th-century Spanish male writers
21st-century Spanish screenwriters